Donald Gilbert Nichols (born 14 July 1931) is a politician in the American state of Florida. He served in the Florida House of Representatives from 1966 to 1971, representing the 27th district.

He attended the University of Florida Law School, graduating in 1960.

References

1931 births
Living people
20th-century American politicians
Democratic Party members of the Florida House of Representatives
University of Florida alumni
Politicians from Chattanooga, Tennessee
Politicians from Jacksonville, Florida